There are two Sydenham Rivers in Ontario.

The Sydenham River (Lake Huron) flows north from Williams Lake and falls over the Niagara Escarpment, through the city of Owen Sound and into Georgian Bay.
The Sydenham River (Lake Saint Clair) flows west and south from near London, emptying into Lake St. Clair at Wallaceburg.